Oskava is a municipality and village in Šumperk District in the Olomouc Region of the Czech Republic. It has about 1,300 inhabitants.

Administrative parts
Villages of Bedřichov, Mostkov and Třemešek are administrative parts of Oskava.

Etymology
Oskava is named after the Oskava River.

Geography
It lies in the Hanušovice Highlands. The northern part of the territory lies within the Jeseníky Protected Landscape Area. The Oskava River, flows through the municipality.

History
The first written mention of Oskava and Mostkov is from 1344. The first written mention of Třemešek is from 1371. The village of Bedřichov was founded in 1620. In 1960, Bedřichov, Mostkov and Třemešek were joined to Oskava.

Sights
Oskava is home to the ruins of Rabštejn Castle from the turn of the 13th and 14th centuries. The castle was first mentioned in 1318. Rabštejn was damaged during the Thirty Years' War and repaired, but at the end of the 17th century, the castle was definitely abandoned and deserted.

References

External links

Villages in Šumperk District